Area code 386 is a Florida telephone area code that was split from 904 on February 15, 2001. It is one of the few area codes in North America that is not contiguous, covering the counties of Columbia, Flagler, Hamilton, Lafayette, Suwannee, Union, the vast majority of Volusia County (with the exception of the unincorporated area of Osteen), and smaller portions of Alachua County and Putnam County. The Deltona–Daytona Beach–Ormond Beach metropolitan area is the most populous metro area in 386.

Description
As noted above, area code 386 is split into two noncontiguous sections. The eastern section covers almost all of Volusia County, with the exception of the southwest (the unincorporated town of Osteen), all of Flagler County, the northernmost portion of Alachua County, and far eastern Putnam County. The western section covers all of Columbia, Hamilton, Lafayette, Suwannee, and Union counties. Daytona Beach and its suburbs are by far the most populous cities in 386.

If one thinks of the area represented by the two portions of area code 386 and area code 904 as a figure somewhat resembling a boomerang, then area code 386 is the left and bottom portions, while area code 904 is the right/top portion of the area. The left or north/west portion is immediately south of the Georgia border, east of the Tallahassee area, and west of the Jacksonville area. Lake City is near the center of this portion of the area code. The bottom or south/east portion of the area code is on the Atlantic coast south of the St. Augustine area and north of Brevard County.

History
Area code 386, which was put into service in July 2001, is one of a few examples of how rapid population growth (and explosive growth in unexpected areas) coupled with an increase in auxiliary devices (such as cell phones and pagers) has led to some unusual, unorthodox, and often controversial solutions to dividing up "full" area codes.

When the current area code system was implemented in 1947, the entire state was in area code 305. In 1953, the southwestern part of the state became area code 813, while 305 continued to serve the rest of the state.  In 1965, everything north of Orlando and the Space Coast was given area code 904. There remained three area codes in Florida until the mid-1980s, when Florida's explosive growth forced further divisions. However, north Florida is not as densely populated as the rest of the state. As a result, 904 remained the sole area code for north Florida for more than 30 years.

In 1997, the old 904 area code was split three ways.  Most of the Florida Panhandle—essentially, everything from Tallahassee westward—was split off to become area code 850, Gainesville and the Nature Coast became area code 352 while Jacksonville and Daytona Beach remained in area code 904.  Although this was intended as a long-term solution, the advent of cell phones, pagers, and other auxiliary devices brought 904 back to the brink of exhaustion within four years' time. This development, along with the rapid growth of both Jacksonville and Daytona Beach, made it obvious that the two cities would need to be in separate area codes.

Once the area became too large to be served by one area code, the Daytona Beach/Halifax Area Chamber of Commerce discovered that area code 386 was not assigned to any other territory. The numbers 386 spell out "FUN" on a phone keypad, and was a perfect device to promote the Fun Coast area. Other government officials and residents were recruited to lobby the Florida Public Service Commission, the body who oversees area code development in Florida, to obtain this area code for the area.

However, when plans were being drawn up for the split, it was discovered that the northwestern portion of the old 904 area code—comprising several exurban and rural areas west of Jacksonville—was too large to stay in 904, even though it was not growing as fast as the areas closer to Jacksonville.   While this northwest portion of 904 was not nearly large enough for its own area code, the two area codes nearest to 904, 850 and 352, were growing too quickly to absorb this portion of 904.

This left only three viable solutions  split the Jacksonville metro area, overlay 904 with a second code, or make two non-contiguous sections of a new area code. The Florida Public Service Commission opted for the third solution, and these two non-contiguous sections became area code 386.  There were some on the commission who saw the odd split in area code 386 as a temporary measure.  However, under current projections, 386 will remain in its noncontiguous state beyond 2040. Despite the rapid growth of the Daytona Beach area, it is nowhere near exhaustion.

When area code 386 was formed, DeBary and Deltona, which had been in 407, were switched from 407 to 386.  In the interim permissive dialing period for DeBary, it was reachable in area codes 407 and 386 but never in area code 904.

See also

List of Florida area codes
List of NANP area codes
North American Numbering Plan

References

External links

 Florida's Area Code History
List of exchanges from AreaCodeDownload.com, 386 Area Code

Telecommunications-related introductions in 2001
386
386
2001 establishments in Florida